Gongylotypa anaetia is a species of moth of the family Tortricidae. It is found in south-eastern Sulawesi, Indonesia.

References

Moths described in 1984
Archipini